Glazer is a surname that is derived from the occupation of the glazier, or glass cutter. Some notable people with this name include:

 Avram Glazer
 Benjamin Glazer, screenwriter, producer, foley artist, and director of American films from the 1920s through the 1950s
 Bryan Glazer
Eugene Glazer (fencer), American Olympic fencer
 Eugene Robert Glazer, American actor
 Frank Glazer, American pianist, composer, and professor of music
 Ilana Glazer, American comedian, writer, and actress
 Jay Glazer, American sportswriter 
 Joel Glazer, entertainment lawyer and former television producer 
 Jonathan Glazer, English director
 Malcolm Glazer, American businessman and sports team owner
 Michael Glazer, television producer and event planner 
 Nathan Glazer, American commentator
 Tom Glazer. American folk singer and songwriter

See also 
 Glaser, surname
 Glaze (surname)

Occupational surnames
Surnames